Ryan Allen Sutter (born September 14, 1974) is an American television personality and former football player. He is the winner on the first season of the dating competition reality TV show The Bachelorette, chosen by inaugural star Trista Rehn. Sutter, a Colorado firefighter, and Rehn were married in a televised wedding on ABC in December 2003.

Prior to his time on the show, Sutter was a college football defensive back with the Colorado Buffaloes football team, and played briefly for the National Football League.

Career
Born in Fort Collins, Colorado, Sutter is a firefighter in that state.

Sports

Football career
Sutter was a defensive back in college with the Colorado Buffaloes football team. He was drafted by the Baltimore Ravens in the fifth round of the 1998 NFL Draft. He was cut late in the 1998 training camp. He then signed with the Carolina Panthers a few days later, not making the active roster until November 28, 1998 (he had been on the Panther's practice squad). In the first play of his first game in the NFL, he injured his shoulder while making a tackle against the New York Jets. He was immediately placed on injured reserve and eventually released. The following summer, he signed with the Seattle Seahawks, but he was cut. In 2000, Sutter played one season for the Barcelona Dragons of NFL Europe. In the spring of 2005, Ryan was invited to a tryout with the New Orleans Saints, but suffered a knee injury during the minicamp.  He has not been in the NFL since.

Other
Ryan Sutter was a competitor on season 9 of American Ninja Warrior. In the Denver Qualifiers, he failed on the third obstacle, the Bouncing Spider, and did not qualify for the Denver Finals.

Personal life
As of 2020, the Sutters live in Avon, Colorado. Ryan Sutter worked for several years as Vail, Colorado firefighter, and in February 2020 joined the Denver Fire Department. The Sutters had son Maxwell Alston on July 26, 2007 and a daughter, Blakesley Grace on April 3, 2009.

On June 10, 2011, Ryan and Trista Sutter appeared in a Hands Only CPR public service announcement for the American Heart Association and the Ad Council.

References

External links

1974 births
Living people
American firefighters
American football safeties
American Ninja Warrior contestants
Male models from Colorado
Barcelona Dragons players
Carolina Panthers players
Colorado Buffaloes football players
Sportspeople from Fort Collins, Colorado
Reality show winners
People from Vail, Colorado
Bachelor Nation contestants